The BL 5.5-inch gun was a British artillery gun introduced during the middle of the Second World War to equip medium batteries.

History
In January 1939 a specification was issued for a gun to replace the 6 inch 26 cwt howitzers in use with most medium batteries. The first units were equipped in UK in the summer of 1941 and in North Africa a year later, 20 guns equipped British and Free French batteries at El Alamein. Subsequently, it also equipped Canadian, Australian, South African, Polish and Indian regiments, and after the war, it was also used by New Zealand.  In the Second World War the normal organization was a regiment of 16 guns organized into two batteries.  The 5.5 was retained in service after the war. It was used by the Royal Artillery on operations in Korea, South Arabia and Borneo.  It was probably used by the Indian Army in wars against Pakistan, and was used by the Pakistan Army against India in the mountains of Kashmir during the Kargil War of 1999.

The South African Defence Force used it extensively in the early stages of the South African Border War, including Operation Savannah, calling it the G2. Approximately 72 are still held in reserve by the South African Army.  In British post-war service it also replaced the BL 4.5-inch medium field gun. When 6-gun batteries were introduced in the late 1950s, medium regiments had 18 guns and the third battery in each field regiment was equipped with 5.5 inch guns instead of 25-pounder guns. It remained in UK service with Territorial Army regiments until 1980 and in Australian service until replaced by M198 in about 1984.

The UK replacement for 5.5 inch was the FH-70 155 mm towed howitzer, in service as the L121. The last 5.5 rounds were fired in the UK in 1995.

In use, the 5.5 was generally towed by the AEC Matador artillery tractor. From the 1950s in British service, the 5.5 was typically towed by an AEC Militant Mk 1 6x6 truck and subsequently the FV 1103 Leyland Martian 6x6 Medium Artillery Tractor .

All 5.5 guns were manufactured in the UK.

Description
There were four marks of 5.5 inch ordnance, although only three and, after World War II, four entered service, and the differences were only minor. There were two marks of carriage where the differences were greater use of welding and less of riveting. The carriages were identical to those used with Ordnance BL 4.5 inch Mark 2. No limber was ever used and the gun fired with its wheels in contact with the ground.

During World War II the PL Locks and AC Slide Boxes (a component separate to the gun attached to the bottom and face of the breech block using a rifle-calibre tube insert to initiate firing of the bagged charge) utilising 0.5 inch (12.7 mm) tubes were replaced by PK Locks and Y Slide Boxes using 0.303 inch (7.7 mm) tubes.

It used one man laying and had Probert pattern calibrating sights. The dial sight was initially the No 7 but was gradually replaced by the No 9. In the 1960s sights were converted from degrees, minutes and yards to mils and metres.  There was no anti-tank telescope. Late in the war a sight adapter was introduced to permit upper register (high angle) fire when the wheels were raised significantly above the level of the spades.

The normal gun detachment was 10 men.

Ammunition

The new lighter shell contained  more explosive and gradually replaced the older, heavier shell.

After World War 2, only HE was used. There was no AP (armour-piercing) round for the gun but, in an emergency, gunners were taught to remove the impact fuze and fire the unfused high explosive as an AP substitute.

The normal HE fuze was No 117, a percussion, impact fuze that was introduced in 1920 and saw use until the 1960s. In late 1944, the T100 proximity fuze became available.

Variants
No variants entered service although the UK developed two self-propelled versions to prototype stage. The first in 1945 used the Crusader gun tractor (developed from the Crusader tank to tow 17-pounder anti-tank guns). It was a turretless design with no casemate.

The second, FV3805, in the 1950s used a Centurion tank carriage, the gun being in a barbette mounting in a fully enclosed casemate. The chassis was reversed, with the enclosed fighting compartment at the rear and the engine, previously at the rear, now at the front. Two prototypes were built, one of which survives and is being restored.

Gallery

Users

Surviving examples

Australia
 Fort Lytton Military Museum, Brisbane.
 National Military Vehicle Museum Edinburgh, South Australia.

France
 Arromanches-les-Bains, Normandy − Musee du Debarquement
 Ranville, Normandy − Memorial Pegasus
 Falaise − Memorial des civils dans la guerre

India
 Southern Command Hospital, Pune
 Regiment of Artillery Museum, Nashik Road

Italy
 Caserma "Cesare Battisti", in Meran

Namibia
 Namibian Army's  4 Artillery Brigade still operationally fields the guns

Netherlands
 Overloon War Museum

New Zealand
 [National Army Museum, Waioiru]·

United Kingdom
 Royal Artillery Museum
 Shropshire Regiment Museum, Shrewsbury Castle.
 Three guns displayed on a roundabout adjacent to MoD Donnington, Telford.
 Imperial War Museum Duxford
 Outside 47 Regt Royal Artillery lines Larkhill
 Outside 203 (Elswick) Battery Royal Artillery lines, Blyth, Northumberland.

 Newhaven Fort

See also 
 155 mm Howitzer M1 US equivalent
 15 cm sFH 18 German equivalent, shorter ranged
 Skoda K-series Czech equivalent, widely used by Germany

References

External links

Specifications sheet

Artillery of the United Kingdom
World War II artillery of the United Kingdom
World War II field artillery
140 mm artillery
Weapons and ammunition introduced in 1941